Tom Taylor (26 July 1889 – 21 July 1966) was a British weightlifter. He competed in the men's featherweight event at the 1924 Summer Olympics. Taylor was also a British champion in the featherweight class, setting multiple British records, and a world record in 1924.

References

External links
 

1889 births
1966 deaths
British male weightlifters
Olympic weightlifters of Great Britain
Weightlifters at the 1924 Summer Olympics
Place of birth missing
20th-century British people